Bramcote School was a preparatory school in Scarborough, North Yorkshire. In 2012, the school merged with Scarborough College and is now known as Scarborough College Prep School.

History
Bramcote School was founded in 1893 by Samuel Savery, who started the first term of the school with only three boys. Savery retired from the school in 1911, and later became the Conservative Member of Parliament for Holderness in 1927, until his death in 1938.

In 2012, the school merged with Scarborough College, situated just across the road. Three staff from Bramcote School moved on when the merger took place. Following the merger, Scarborough College Junior School was renamed Bramcote Junior School.

Headmasters
Source:

 Samuel Savery (1893–1911)
 Douglas Slater (1909–1925)
 Richard Pidcock (1909–1945)
 Oswald Cooper (1930–1957)
 Jim Hornby (1957-1970s)
 Frank Hamerton (1957-1970s)
 Colin McGarrigle (1970s–1983)
 John Fuller-Sessions (1970s–1990)
 John Gerrard (1980s–1992)
 John Walker (1992–1996)
 Peter Kirk (1996–2003)
 Andrew Lewin (2003–2006)
 Andrew Snow (2006–2012)
 Dan Davey (2012–2015)
 Chris Barker (2015–present)

Notable alumni
 Sir Geoffrey Vickers, winner of the Victoria Cross, former Deputy Director-General of the Ministry of Economic Warfare
 Sir John Meynell Alleyne, Fourth Baronet, DSC, DSO, former Royal Navy Captain
 Denys Gillam, DSO & Two Bars, DFC & Bar, AFC, former RAF pilot
 Robert Irving, former RAF pilot and conductor
 Alan Webb, actor – stage and film
 JB Blanc, actor – stage, television and film
James Norton, actor – stage, television and film.

References

Bibliography
 

Defunct schools in North Yorkshire